Goodison is a metronymic surname, from the old English personal name Godgifu (God's gift), later simply "Goody". Notable holders of this surname include:

Benjamin Goodison (c.1700–1767), cabinetmaker to George II of Great Britain
Ian Goodison (born 1972), Jamaican professional footballer
John R. Goodison (1866–1926), Newfoundland merchant and political figure
John Goodison (musician) (1943–1995), English rock musician and producer
Lara Goodison (born 1989/90), English actress
Lorna Goodison (born 1947), Jamaican poet
Lucy Goodison, English archaeologist
Sir Nicholas Goodison (1934–2021), British businessman
Paul Goodison (born 1977), English Olympic sailor
Wayne Goodison (born 1964), English professional footballer
William Goodison (surgeon) (1785–1836), Irish-born British army surgeon
William Goodison (politician) (1876–1928), Canadian businessman and member of Parliament

See also
Goodison Park, football stadium (home to Everton F.C.) in Liverpool, England, named for the adjacent Goodison Road, itself named for George Goodison, civil engineer
Goodison, Michigan, locality named for William Goodison, miller

References